This is a list of Italian football transfers for the 2010–11 season. Only moves from Serie A and Serie B are listed.

The Italian winter transfer window would open for 4 weeks from 3 January 2011 (Monday). Players without a club may join one, either during or in between transfer windows. International transfers outward were depends on the status of transfer windows of the country the player arrived.

Clubs may still use its single non-EU international signing quota in winter windows if they did not use the quota in summer, subject to the club had either released (on 1 July 2010), sold aboard or named one player which had obtained an EU passport recently. Those transfers were marked yellow.

Winter transfer window

Notes
Player officially joined his new club on 3 January 2011.

Out of window transfer

References
General
 
 
 
 

  
 
 
 
Specific

External links

Italy
Trans
2010–11